Desmond Nangle (born 1943) is an Irish former Gaelic footballer. He played with club side Ballincollig, divisional side Muskerry and at inter-county level with the Cork senior football team.

Honours

Cork
Munster Under-21 Football Championship: 1963
All-Ireland Minor Football Championship: 1961
Munster Minor Football Championship: 1961

References

1943 births
Living people
Ballincollig Gaelic footballers
Businesspeople from County Cork
Muskerry Gaelic footballers
Cork inter-county Gaelic footballers